Knyvett is a surname. Notable people with the surname include:

Carey Frederick Knyvett (1885–1967), second Bishop of Selby
Charles Knyvett (1752–1822), English musician
Thomas Knyvett (died 1512), young English nobleman who was a close associate of King Henry VIII early in his reign
Thomas Knyvett, 4th Baron Berners (1539–1616), High Sheriff of the English county of Norfolk in 1579
Thomas Knyvett, 7th Baron Berners (1655–1693), English peer and Tory politician
Sir William Knyvett, married Jane or Joan Courtenay during the Wars of the Roses
William Knyvett (singer) (1779–1856), British singer and composer, son of Charles Knyvett
William Knyvett (athlete) (1882–1929), British track and field athlete who competed in the 1908 Summer Olympics

See also
Knyvett Baronets, of Buckenham in the County of Norfolk, was a title in the Baronetage of England